The three Rs (as in the letter R) are three basic skills taught in schools: reading, writing and arithmetic (usually said as "reading, 'riting, and 'rithmetic"). The phrase appears to have been coined at the beginning of the 19th century.

The term has also been used to name other triples (see Other uses).

Origin and meaning
The skills themselves are alluded to in St. Augustine's Confessions:  'learning to read, and write, and do arithmetic'.

The phrase is sometimes attributed to a speech given by Sir William Curtis circa 1807: this is disputed. An extended modern version of the three Rs consists of the "functional skills of literacy, numeracy and ICT".

The educationalist Louis P. Bénézet preferred "to read", "to reason", "to recite", adding, "by reciting I did not mean giving back, verbatim, the words of the teacher or of the textbook. I meant speaking the English language."

Other uses
More recent meanings of "the three Rs" are:
 In the subject of CNC code generation by Edgecam Workflow: Rapid, Reliable, and Repeatable
 In the subject of sustainability: Reduce, Reuse, and Recycle
 In animal welfare principles in research (see The Three Rs for animals): Replacement, Reduction, and Refinement
 (See also 3R disambiguation)

See also 
 Standards based education reform
 Traditional education
 Trivium (education)

Notes

Education reform
Latin words and phrases